is an active stratovolcano in Honshu, Japan. It is situated at the southwest of Myōkō city, Niigata Prefecture, and a part of Jōshin'etsu-kōgen National Park.

Name
 is another name given to this mountain. This can be also written as 妙高山, in order to make use of two "lucky" characters.

Geology and geography 
Mount Myōkō was formed beginning about 300,000 years ago, in a series of eruptions producing a broad spectrum of lava types including basalt, andesite, and dacite. About 6,000 years ago, the central crater developed and assumed its present shape. A lava dome forms the volcano's present summit. The most recent eruptions about 4,300 years ago produced pyroclastic flows down the eastern flanks. Present activity is solfataric from fumaroles near the lava dome where sulfur was once mined.

There are onsen and ski resorts at the foot of the mountain, including Akakura, Suginohara and Ikenotaira.

Related facts 
The heavy cruiser Myōkō of the Imperial Japanese Navy  and an Aegis destroyer of the Japan Maritime Self-Defense Force are named after this mountain. The JR East train service Myōkō is also named after the mountain.

The mountain appears invariably in school songs of elementary and middle schools in the Jōetsu Region.

In 1990 the Nippon Jamboree, a camping festival, was held on the  during which the participants climbed the mountain.

See also
 List of volcanoes in Japan
 List of mountains in Japan

References

External links

 Myokosan - Japan Meteorological Agency 
  - Japan Meteorological Agency
 Myoko San - Geological Survey of Japan
 

Mountains of Niigata Prefecture
Stratovolcanoes of Japan
Volcanoes of Honshū
Volcanoes of Niigata Prefecture
Myōkō, Niigata
Pleistocene stratovolcanoes
Holocene stratovolcanoes